Howell's School is an independent day school for girls in Llandaff, a district in northern Cardiff, Wales. It consists of a nursery, infants, junior, senior school and a sixth form. The sixth form became coeducational in September 2005 and was renamed Howell's Co-ed College.

History
In 1537, Thomas Howell, a Welsh merchant trading in Bristol, London and Seville, bequeathed 12,000 gold ducats to the Drapers' Company to provide dowries "every yere for Maydens for ever."  His "Merchant's Mark" is still used as a logo for the school. The school's magazine is called the Golden Ducat in reference to the bequest.

After founding a girls' school of the same name in the town of Denbigh, the Company started building the Llandaff school in 1859 and opened to girls the following year. In 1899 it was expanded to accommodate boarders but the boarding programme has been discontinued. The school still retains its links as the Company has a representative in the school board. It was originally housed in a building designed by Decimus Burton, on the outskirts of the village of Llandaff. The school admitted its first pupils, with Emily Baldwin as the first Headmistress. Today it occupies a large site north of Cardiff city centre.

In 1980 the school joined the Girls' Day School Trust and is under its governance. It is the only member school in Wales.

Novelist Roald Dahl spent part of his childhood at Cumberland Lodge, which was later acquired by the school.

In 2005 The school opened the GDST's first co-educational sixth form with the admission of 26 boys into year 12.

Key dates
1859–60 Howell's School built.
1860 Emily Baldwin appointed Headmistress.
1860 Classes started with 60 pupils.
1872 Miss Ewing appointed Headmistress.
1880 Miss Kendall appointed Headmistress.
1887 Sanatorium built.
1896 Cookery School built.
1900 Great Hall built.
1906 Steward's Wing built.
1906 Hywelian Guild established.
1920 Miss Kendall retired.
1920 Miss Trotter appointed as Headmistress.
1937 Swimming pool built.
1937 Miss Knight appointed as Headmistress.
1941 Miss Lewis appointed as Headmistress.
1950 Science laboratories built.
1960 Bryntaf and Oaklands acquired as extra boarding houses.
1960 Hywelians donated grand piano.
1978 Miss Turner appointed as Headmistress.
1980 Howell's School joined the Girls' Day School Trust.
1984 Junior School for ages 7–11 opened.
1990 Music Block and Octagon Room built.
1991 Mrs Jane Fitz appointed as Headmistress.
1993 Boarding ceased and houses remodelled for the Sixth Form.
1997 Nursery opened accepting girls from the age of three. 
1997 Sports Hall and Fitness Suite built.
2001 New laboratory and renovation programme completed.
2003 New Junior School building and extension project commenced.
2004 Tŷ Hapus (Happy House), new building for Junior School completed and Junior School intake doubled. 
2005 Co-educational Sixth Form College established – first young men in school in 145 years.
2007 Mrs Sally Davis appointed as Principal.
2008 Howell's becomes a Fairtrade School.
2010 Howell's celebrates 150 years since its opening.

Academics
Howell's is one of Wales's top performing independent schools. In 2011 it made the top 100 schools in the United Kingdom based on GCSE results and ranked first in Wales.

Notable former pupils

Alumnae are known as Hywelians and are entitled membership of the Hywelian Guild. It was founded in 1906 by old girls and is also open to former staff members and teachers.

Fiona Bruce, Conservative MP
Patricia Clarke, biochemist
Ann Cotton, educational entrepreneur and philanthropist
Janet Davies, Welsh politician
Jem, pop singer
Jean McFarlane, Baroness McFarlane of Llandaff, the holder of the first Chair of Nursing in an English university, at the University of Manchester
Julie Morgan, Labour MP
Lucy Owen (née Cohen), BBC Wales news presenter
Jo Walton, fantasy and science fiction writer
Hannah Mills, Olympic Gold Medalist, MBE
Charlotte Church, Singer and Actress.

Gallery

References

External links

School Website
Profile on MyDaughter
Profile on the GDST website
Profile on the Good Schools Guide
Estyn Inspection Reports

Educational institutions established in 1860
Schools of the Girls' Day School Trust
Member schools of the Girls' Schools Association
Member schools of the Headmasters' and Headmistresses' Conference
Private schools in Cardiff
 
Llandaff
1860 establishments in Wales
Grade II* listed buildings in Cardiff